The 1930 Invercargill by-election was a by-election during the 23rd New Zealand Parliament in the Southland electorate of . The by-election occurred following the death of Sir Joseph Ward on 8 July 1930. The by-election, which was held on 13 August, was won by the late Prime Minister's second son, Vincent Ward against James Hargest.

Background
It was generally expected that his political career was over.

Soon after the 1928 election, Sir Joseph became Prime Minister for the second time. Under pressure from party colleagues, he resigned as Prime Minister due to ill health in May 1930. Sir Joseph died less than two months later on 8 July.

Candidates
Over the last years, Vincent Ward had acted as a political assistant to his father. He was nominated by the United Party in the resulting by-election, which was held on 13 August. His selection was not supported by all, and some had preferred William Hinchey, a former Mayor of Bluff.

Ward Jr. was opposed by James Hargest, who had been narrowly beaten by Ward Sr. in the 1925 general election. Hargest was regarded as a capable candidate, and he dealt with being heckled in large meetings quite well. Hargest claimed that as a director of a North Island company, Ward as an absentee could not effectively represent the Invercargill electorate. Hargest also appealed to Labour voters that he worked as hard as they did. He defended himself against the view that it should be Ward's right to succeed his father.

Just before nominations closed, the independent candidate William Hinchey withdrew from the contest. The local Labour Party branch apparently had decided on the Rev John Archer, at the time the Mayor of Christchurch, as their first choice. Second choice was William Denham an Invercargill City Councillor (who was elected as Invercargill's MP in 1935). Then, Tom O'Byrne was considered as a candidate. It is unclear why the decision was made not to stand a candidate.

Election meetings were well attended. Hargest had over 2000 attendees at his last meeting in the town hall.

Election results

Previous election

By-election results
Hargest was beaten in by Ward Jr., who had a majority of 571 votes (5.82%).

Vincent Ward retired at the end of the term in 1931. Ward was called to the Legislative Council in 1934 and served there until his death in 1946.

See also
List of New Zealand by-elections
1873 Invercargill by-election
1878 Invercargill by-election

Notes

References

1930 elections in New Zealand
Invercargill 1930
Politics of Southland, New Zealand